Katherine Elizabeth "Katie" Leigh Joseph is an American voice actress, She has voice acted in both television, film and occasionally video game roles.

Career
Katie Leigh is known for her voice roles such as Sunni Gummi in Disney's Adventures of the Gummi Bears, Zuzu in Poppy Cat, Alex in the first two seasons of Totally Spies!, and as Connie Kendall in the Focus on the Family radio program Adventures in Odyssey since 1987 and is one of two remaining original cast members of the show (the other being Chris Anthony). She also did the voice of the 2010 Red Rover electronic game.

Personal life 
Leigh identifies as a Christian.

Filmography

Television 
 The Adventures of the Little Prince — Little Prince (English dub)
 The Adventures of Raggedy Ann and Andy — Sunny Bunny, French Doll
 Aladdin — Additional Voices
 All—New Dennis the Menace — Gina Gillotti, Joey MacDonald
 All the Way to the Ocean — James
 Animalia — Zoe, Fushia Fox, Snipsy Alligator
 As Told By Ginger — Jr. Harris and Jr. Harris Jr.
 B—Daman CrossFire — Riki's Teacher, Simon Sumiya
 Blue Dragon — Noi
 Bonkers — Additional Voices
 Danger Rangers — Adam
 Darkwing Duck — Honker Muddlefoot
 Doc McStuffins – Tiny Tessie
 Dogtanian and the Three Muskehounds  — Juliette
 Dumbo's Circus — Dumbo, Additional Voices
 Dungeons and Dragons — Sheila the Thief
 Disney's Adventures of the Gummi Bears — Sunni Gummi, Additional Voices
 Get Blake! — Skye Gunderson
 Hey Duggee — Additional Voices
 Hi Hi Puffy AmiYumi — King Chad, Madame Blubbery, Pierre, and Parsephus
 It's Punky Brewster — additional Voices
 Kampung Boy — Mat
 Lego Star Wars: The Padawan Menace — "Ian"/Mari Amithest/Ashla
 Little Angels — Michael, Hayley
 Little Wizards — Voice
 The Mr. Men Show — Little Miss Chatterbox, Little Miss Daredevil, Little Miss Helpful
 Jim Henson's Muppet Babies — Baby Rowlf, Mrs. Mitchell
 My Little Pony — Sundance, Fizzy, Baby Shady, Additional Voices
 Olivia — Lily, Daisy, Additional Voices
 Pandamonium — Peggy
 Poochie — Danny Evans
 Poppy Cat — Zuzu (US dub)
 Pound Puppies — Additional Voices (season 2)
 ProStars — Additional Voices
 Puppy in My Pocket: Adventures in Pocketville — Mela
 Rainbow Butterfly Unicorn Kitty — Athena the Owl
 Roary the Racing Car — Additional Voices
 The Real Ghostbusters — Jason, Cindy
 Richie Rich (1996 TV series) — Richie, Irona
 Robot Man & Friends — Stellar
 Rugrats — Additional Voices
 Sailor Moon: Sailor Stars — Sailor Iron Mouse
 Slimer! And the Real Ghostbusters — Jason
 Space Racers — Sojourner, Sandpiper, Crow
 The Buzz on Maggie — Additional Voices
 The Glo Friends
 The Smurfs — Denisa
 Totally Spies! — Alex (main role; 52 episodes)
 Yo—kai Watch — Usapyon
 Zatch Bell! — Pamoon

Films 
 A Martian Christmas — Roxy
 Babe: Pig in the City — Kitten
 My Little Pony: The Movie — Fizzy, Baby Sundance
 Surviving: A Family in Crisis — ADR for Heather O'Rourke
 Despicable Me — Additional Voices
 Indiana Jones and the Temple of Doom — Voice of Maharaja (uncredited)
 Puss in Boots: A Furry Tail — Voice of Queen Marie
 Tappy Toes — Voice of Pingo
 Gallavants — Voice of Koosh
 Monster Island — Carlotta, Patrick's Mom
 Monster Hunter: Legends of the Guild — Elder Daazeel
 Music Machine: Benny’s Biggest Battle — Voice of Benny Bear
 Mummy, I'm a Zombie — Piroska, Miss Peachfeather

Radio 
 Adventures in Odyssey — Connie Kendall (1987–present)

Video games 
 Deus Ex: The Fall — Camila Cardoso, Receptionist Xng, Junkie, Civilians
 EverQuest II — Lisori, Frizi Figglesnip
 Giana Sisters: Twisted Dreams — Giana/Punk Giana, Maria
 Grim Fandango — Bibi, Makeup Woman
 Indiana Jones and the Temple of Doom — Maharajah
 Infamous 2 — Female Pedestrians
 Infamous: Festival of Blood — Female Pedestrians
 Lost Odyssey — Soldier
 Nerf—n—Strike — Asian boy
 Off The Record: The Italian Affair — Girl. A green check mark indicates that a role has been confirmed using a screenshot (or collage of screenshots) of a title's list of voice actors and their respective characters found in its opening and/or closing credits and/or other reliable sources of information.
 Palace Pets — Blondie
 Shenmue III — Additional Cast
 Star Ocean: First Departure — Millie Chliette
 Zatch Bell! Mamodo Fury — Pamoon
Palace Pets App — Matey and Blondie
 Mystery Case Files: The Black Veil — Allison Sterling

Author 
 Adventures in Oddity

References

External links 
 
 
 
 

Living people
American Christians
American radio actresses
American video game actresses
American voice actresses
20th-century American actresses
21st-century American actresses
Year of birth missing (living people)